The 2014–15 New York Islanders season was the 43rd season in the franchise's history. This was the team's final full season of play at Nassau Veterans Memorial Coliseum. The Islanders competed in the Metropolitan Division of the Eastern Conference (NHL) for the second season.

Jaroslav Halak entered the season as the team's new starting goaltender, leading their previous starting goaltender, veteran Evgeni Nabokov, to sign with the Tampa Bay Lightning as a free agent. Chad Johnson was brought in to be Halak's backup, however he was later traded for Michal Neuvirth who took over the role. John Tavares served as the team's captain for the second season, alongside Kyle Okposo and Frans Nielsen in their sixth and first seasons, respectively, as alternate captains. Around the midpoint of the season, Cal Clutterbuck was named an alternate captain after an injury sidelined Okposo.

The Islanders qualified for the 2015 Stanley Cup playoffs after finishing the season in third place in the Metropolitan Division and fifth in the Eastern Conference with 101 points. The playoff berth was the team's second post-season berth in three seasons, having qualified in 2012–13 but not in 2013–14. The team was eliminated in the first round of the Stanley Cup playoffs, losing in seven games to the Washington Capitals.

Off-season
On May 22, 2014, the Islanders signed unrestricted free agent goaltender Jaroslav Halak to a four-year extension to keep him under contract through the 2017–18 season after trading for him from the Washington Capitals for the Blackhawks' fourth-round pick in the 2014 Entry Draft earlier in the month. The Islanders also acquired two defenseman on October 4, 2014, one week before their first regular season game—Johnny Boychuk was traded from the Boston Bruins in exchange for 2015 (used on Brandon Carlo) and 2016 draft picks, while Nick Leddy was traded from the Chicago Blackhawks along with amateur goaltender Kent Simpson in exchange for T. J. Brennan, Ville Pokka and the rights to Anders Nilsson.

Regular season

October–December

Before the Islanders began their regular season, Matt Carkner, Calvin de Haan, Michael Grabner and Lubomir Visnovsky were placed on injured reserve (IR), while previous first round Islanders draft picks, rookies Griffin Reinhart and Ryan Strome, impressed the coaching staff enough to make the opening night roster for their first times. The team won their first four consecutive games, including a back-to-back against the Carolina Hurricanes in games one and two. de Haan and Visnovsky returned to the team during October, leading to the decision to send Reinhart back to the Islanders' minor league affiliate, the American Hockey League's Bridgeport Sound Tigers. Soon after, injuries to Mikhail Grabovski and Josh Bailey led the team to call up Anders Lee from the Sound Tigers. As Lee began to cement his place on the roster and Grabovski was set to return, coaching staff had to make a decision in order to open up a roster spot, as only 23 players maximum are allowed on a team's roster before the trade deadline. Ultimately, rather than sending Lee back, it was Colin McDonald who was placed on waivers, which he cleared on his way to the Sound Tigers. Their 6–4–0 record by the end of October matched their best record in the team's first ten games since the 2001–02 season.

In recent seasons, the Islanders have not had positive results in the month of November. The previous season saw them finish with a November record of 4–13–1. Bailey returned from his hand injury during the month, while Eric Boulton, who had only played three games so far in the season, was placed on IR. They finished the month with an 11–3–0 record, only the second time in franchise history they recorded at least 11 wins in the month of November. It was also the first time they were undefeated in home games (6–0–0) during the month since the 1984–85 season. On November 28, Head Coach Jack Capuano recorded his 300th game with the team, a number not reached since Al Arbour hit the number in the team's early years, with the closest to Capuano being Terry Simpson with 81 Islanders' games coached.

As December began, injuries provided setbacks with Michael Grabner and Lubomir Visnovsky returning to the IR, joined by Johnny Boychuk, Travis Hamonic and Casey Cizikas. Visnovsky and Cizikas missed only two and three games respectively, but defenseman Boychuk and Hamonic needed the majority of the month to recover. Griffin Reinhart was recalled from the Sound Tigers at the beginning of the month, but was sent back down once the injured defenseman were set to return. Joining him on the Sound Tigers would be Cory Conacher, who was waived on December 13 after recording only three points in 15 games. Conacher was originally placed on the team's top line, alongside John Tavares and Kyle Okposo, however he did not last long there as the coaching staff began trying out various other players to fill the spot. Jaroslav Halak suffered a lower body injury on December 20, after recording his 11th consecutive win earlier in the month and passing the previous franchise record of 10 set by Billy Smith. The injury led to Kevin Poulin being called up from the Sound Tigers; he only played in one game, a 3–4 shootout loss to the Buffalo Sabres. Halak returned the following game, in a 4–3 overtime win against the Washington Capitals. The team finished the calendar year of 2014 with a share of first place in their division for the first time in 27 years.

January–April
The Islanders put together a 6–3–0 January record to bring into the All-Star Game break. Near the beginning of the month, Lubomir Visnovsky was placed back on IR with an upper body injury and would later be joined by Eric Boulton with a lower-body injury, who had been taken off the list about a month prior on December 11 and only played once since. Michael Grabner returned from his lower body injury on January 6 after missing eight games. On January 10, John Tavares was named to the All-Star Game as the sole representative of the Islanders. After injuries to goaltenders Jimmy Howard of the Detroit Red Wings and Pekka Rinne of the Nashville Predators, Halak and the Pittsburgh Penguins' Marc-Andre Fleury were named as their replacements. At the All-Star Game, Tavares scored four goals, matching an All-Star Game record for an individual player's goals scored, while Halak stopped six of tens shots in the third period; their team, captained by Jonathan Toews of the Chicago Blackhawks, won the game by a record-setting score of 17–12. After the break, it was announced that alternate captain Kyle Okposo would miss six-to-eight weeks after receiving an upper-body injury, later revealed to be a detached retina that he had recently received surgery for. The injury led to Cal Clutterbuck being named as an alternate captain. In their first game back from the break, the Islanders defeated the rival New York Rangers, earning their third consecutive victory over the team, all by a gap of three goals; this marked the first time the Islanders won three consecutive games against the Rangers since 2007.

On February 19, Halak tied a franchise record for most wins in a season after earning his 32nd against the Nashville Predators, with 30 saves against 32 shots. He went on to break the record, recording his 33rd win of the season on February 27, in a 2–1 victory over the Calgary Flames. Injuries continued rolling, with Casey Cizikas and Mikhail Grabovski both being placed on IR, with a lower body injury and an upper body injury, respectively. Matt Carkner was removed from IR after spending the entire season sidelined from back surgery, and was sent to the Sound Tigers after clearing waivers. As the team continued their push for the top spot in the Metropolitan Division standings, it was announced that defenseman Nick Leddy signed a seven-year contract worth $38.5 million on February 24.

The NHL trade deadline on March 5 ended with the Islanders making four trades. Two of the trades involved minor league players Cory Conacher and David Leggio sent to the Vancouver Canucks and Arizona Coyotes, respectively, in exchange for Dustin Jeffrey and Mark Louis. Halak received a new backup goaltender when Chad Johnson was sent to the Buffalo Sabres, with the Islanders picking up Michal Neuvirth in return. General Manager Garth Snow cited Neuvirth's good play during the season and Johnson's relatively poor performance thus far as the reason for the trade; Johnson had attained an 8–8–1 record with a .889 save percentage with the Islanders. Outside of the goaltending change, the main roster went untouched with the exception of adding Tyler Kennedy, who was acquired from the San Jose Sharks in exchange for a conditional 2015 draft pick. Snow recognized the team's chemistry as the main reason for not making any major main roster trades. The first game the Islanders played after the trade deadline was set to debut Kennedy, but an upper body injury announced just before the start of the game prevented him from playing. During the game, Matt Martin kneed Dallas Stars defenseman Trevor Daley, resulting in a one-game suspension. With Kennedy injured and Martin suspended, Eric Boulton and Casey Cizikas were activated off of IR before the next game on March 5 against the Nashville Predators after missing 19 and eight games, respectively. The following game featured the debut for Neurvirth with the Islanders, as the team fell in a shootout to the Florida Panthers. Capuano chose to start him again the following game, as Neuvirth picked up his first win with the team in a 4–3 overtime victory against the Toronto Maple Leafs on March 9.

Without Nick Leddy, who was injured against the Maple Leafs, the Islanders faced the Rangers on March 10 for their fourth matchup of the season, which ended in a Rangers victory for the first time of the season series. The Islanders dropped their next three as they continued playing short of Leddy, stringing together a four-game losing streak for the first time in the season. During the stretch, Jaroslav Halak missed two games due to a lower-body injury. Halak and Leddy both returned the following game against the New Jersey Devils on March 21, as Halak shut out the Devils in a 3–0 victory. The team's struggles continued as they looked to secure a playoff berth, going 2–3–2 over the next seven games before their trip to the postseason was locked in on April 9; the Florida Panthers defeated the Boston Bruins and eliminated the possibility of the ninth-seeded Bruins catching the Islanders in the standings. Despite having clinched, the following game against the Pittsburgh Penguins had high stakes, with the Penguins still chasing a playoffs spot and the Islanders looking to get the home-ice advantage in the first round of the playoffs; the Islanders ultimately won, 3–1, and locked up an opening playoff series against the Washington Capitals. The final game of the season, which was also the final regular-season game the Islanders would play at Nassau Coliseum (until the 2018–19 NHL season), was a 5–4 shootout loss to the Columbus Blue Jackets, as the Islanders were unable to pick up both points with home-ice advantage against the Capitals on the line.

Playoffs

The New York Islanders entered the playoffs as the Metropolitan Division's third seed. They lost to the Washington Capitals in seven games.

Standings

Schedule and results

Pre-season

Regular season

Playoffs

Player statistics

Final stats
Skaters

Goaltenders

†Denotes player spent time with another team before joining the Islanders. Stats reflect time with the Islanders only.
‡Denotes player was traded mid-season. Stats reflect time with the Islanders only.
Bold/italics denotes franchise record.

Notable achievements

Awards

Milestones

Player injuries

Updated as of February 15, 2014

Player uspensions and fines
Two players received fines during the season, while only Matt Martin received a suspension. Anders Lee was given a $2,286.29 fine on December 9, 2014, for elbowing St. Louis Blues defenseman Carl Gunnarsson; the incident occurred during NHL Game No. 397 in New York on December 6, 2014, at 7:15 of the second period. Cal Clutterbuck received a fine on January 28, 2015, for $2,000 due to diving/embellishment, which occurred during NHL Game No. 676 in New York on January 19, 2015, at 19:04 of the second period. Martin received a one-game suspension with a $5,376.34 forfeit on March 5, 2015, for kneeing Dallas Stars defenseman Trevor Daley in NHL Game No. 948 the day prior; he was ejected from the game and received fifteen total penalty minutes.

Transactions

Following the end of the Islanders' 2013–14 season, and during the 2014–15 season, this team has been involved in the following transactions:

Trades

Free agency

The Islanders lost two players to free agency on July 1, 2014 – goaltenders Anders Nilsson and Evgeni Nabokov. Nilsson signed a one-year contract with the Ak Bars Kazan of the Kontinental Hockey League (KHL), while Nabokov signed a one-year, $1.55 million contract with the Tampa Bay Lightning.

The team acquired nine free agents, all on July 1, 2014. Of the nine signed, five players played at least one regular season game with the team – Chad Johnson, Cory Conacher, Harry Zolnierczyk, Mikhail Grabovski and Nikolay Kulemin, though Conacher and Zolnierczyk have spent the majority of the season with the Islanders' AHL affiliate, the Bridgeport Sound Tigers.

Waivers transactions 
One player was picked up off waivers during the season – Jack Skille was claimed by the Columbus Blue Jackets on October 5, 2014. Seven other players were put on waivers by the Islanders during the season and sent to the Sound Tigers once cleared: David Leggio, Kevin Poulin, Harry Zolnierczyk, Aaron Ness, Colin McDonald, Cory Conacher and Matt Carkner. Poulin, Zolnierczyk, and McDonald were all recalled to the Islanders at least once during the regular season.

Player signings

Draft picks

The 2014 NHL Entry Draft was held on June 27–28, 2014 at the Wells Fargo Center in Philadelphia, Pennsylvania. The Islanders finished 26th overall in the league standings during the 2013–14 season, to secure the fifth overall pick.

The team's two second-round picks went to the Tampa Bay Lightning as a result of a trade on June 27, 2014 that sent a 2014 first-round pick to the Islanders. Their third-round pick went to the Florida Panthers as a result of a trade on that sent a 2015 third-round pick to the Islanders. The Islanders' fifth-round pick and Thomas Vanek were traded to the Montreal Canadiens on March 5, 2014 in exchange for Sebastian Collberg and a conditional second-round pick in 2014; the condition was based on the Canadiens qualifying for the 2014 playoffs. The team's seventh-round pick went to the Lightning as a result of a trade that sent the Lightning's seventh round picks in 2014 and 2015 to the Islanders.

References

External links
 2014–15 New York Islanders Media Guide

New York Islanders seasons
New York
New York Islanders season, 2014-15
New York Island
New York Island